The Women's 10 kilometre freestyle at the FIS Nordic World Ski Championships 2013 was held on 26 February 2013. A 5 km qualifying event took place on 20 February.

Results

Race 
The race was started at 12:45.

Qualification  
The Qualification was held at 12:45.

References

FIS Nordic World Ski Championships 2013
2013 in Italian women's sport